St. John's German Evangelical Church or variations may refer to:

St. John's Evangelical Church (Louisville, Kentucky), a German Evangelical church significant in History of the Germans in Louisville
St. John's Evangelical Lutheran German Church and Cemetery, Hayes Center, Nebraska, listed on the National Register of Historic Places (NRHP)
St. John's German Evangelical Lutheran Church, Lyons, Nebraska, NRHP-listed
German Evangelical St. Johns Church (Hebron, North Dakota), also known as Deutsche Evangelische St. Johannes Kirche, NRHP-listed
St. John's Evangelical Lutheran Church (Springfield, Ohio), also known as St. John's Evangelical German Lutheran Church, NRHP-listed
St. John's Lutheran Church (Walhalla, South Carolina), also known as St. John's German Evangelical Church of Walhalla, NRHP-listed
Saint John's Evangelical Lutheran Church (Milwaukee, Wisconsin), a German Evangelical church, NRHP-listed
St. John's United Church of Christ, Richmond, Virginia, a historic church originally known as Saint John's German Lutheran Evangelical Church